Dhilluku Dhuddu 2 is a 2019 Indian Tamil-language horror comedy film written and directed by Rambhala. The film stars Santhanam and Shritha Sivadas, while Rajendran and Urvashi play supporting roles. The film's soundtrack is composed by Shabir. The film is a spiritual sequel to 2016 film Dhilluku Dhuddu.

The film was shot in 40 days. The film released on 7 February 2019. The film was remade in Telugu as Raju Gari Gadhi 3. The climax of the movie is heavily inspired by the Hollywood film The Conjuring 2.

Plot 
Viji and his maternal uncle are happy-go-lucky guys who create a nuisance for their neighbours due to their drunken antics. The neighbours try out different methods to escape their antics, but in vain. One of the neighbours, Karthik, who is a doctor by profession, comes across nurse Maya, whom he is in love with. However, when Karthik tries to express his love, he is beaten black and blue by a mysterious ghost. After finding out details about Maya and the ghost, the doctor and other neighbours plot against Viji to make him fall in love with Maya and let the ghost take care of him. Injured in a fight, Viji, seeking a physiotherapist's help, falls in love with Maya, who was engineered by his neighbours. Things take a twist, and Viji is thrashed by the ghost. Viji finds out that Maya's father Garudaraja Bhattadhri is a powerful magician in Kerala and that he had set the ghost to protect Maya. Viji sets out to Kerala to convince Maya's father, along with his uncle. They insult Bhattadhri, and he sets out to do a pooja to harm them. To escape that, they ask for Chakra Mahadevi's help. It turns out that both Bhattadhri and Mahadevi are fake and that there is a real ghost protecting Maya. They go to a black magician, where he reveals the flashback about the ghost.

In 1857, a British man named George Williams went to India, where he seduced girls and ruined their lives. Due to a job transfer, he came to Kerala, where his lustful gaze fell on Devyani Kutti, but he was unaware that she was the daughter of the king of black magic, Marthanda Varma. Soon, Marthanda Varma learned about George, so to kill George, he took the great Yatchi palm script on a pournami day and gave an order to Yatchi to protect his daughter. That night, George proposes to Devyani and at that moment, Yatchi killed George. After British left India, he stuffed Yatchi into an idol and buried it.

After that, Maya's father says that he has a similar Yatchi in his house, so the magician does some pooja to determine whether it is active, so that time it is active. To kill the Yatchi, they need to retrieve the palm script from the bungalow where Maya's father took the Yatchi. Viji and others had various encounters with other ghosts there, and then they finally retrieved the palm script and killed the ghost. The end credits show Viji and Maya's marriage.

Cast

Soundtrack 
The soundtrack was composed by Shabir.

Marketing 
The first look poster of the film was released on 24 October 2018. The official teaser of the film was released on 29 October 2018. The second teaser of the film was unveiled on 14 January 2019 on the eve of Thai Pongal. Both of the teasers received positive reviews from the audience.

Release 
The film released on 7 February 2019.

References 

2010s Tamil-language films
Indian comedy horror films
Films set in a fictional location
Indian haunted house films
Indian sequel films
2019 films
Tamil films remade in other languages